William George Arthur Ormsby-Gore, 4th Baron Harlech,  (11 April 1885 – 14 February 1964), was a British Conservative politician and banker.

Background
Harlech, the son of George Ormsby-Gore, 3rd Baron Harlech, and Lady Margaret Gordon, daughter of Charles Gordon, 10th Marquess of Huntly, was born at Eaton Square, London. He was educated at Eton College and New College, Oxford.

Military service and First World War
Ormsby-Gore served in the Territorial Army, being commissioned a second lieutenant in the Shropshire Yeomanry in 1907 and promoted lieutenant in 1911.

He was mobilized at the outbreak of the First World War and accompanied his regiment to Egypt, where he was promoted captain in 1915 and went onto the general staff. In 1916 he joined the Arab Bureau as an intelligence officer, attached to the British High Commissioner Sir Henry A. McMahon.

He strongly opposed the Sykes-Picot treaty, arguing "we make professions of defending and helping small & oppressed nations... [yet] we parcel out between our allies & ourselves vast tracts of countries which do not want us." He argued that Britain should support self-determination for Arabs and Jews. He challenged claims that Africans were incapable of governing themselves. He saw white prejudices as the fundamental problem, not the incapability of non-whites. After becoming a MP, Ormsby-Gore pressured the British government to accept a League of Nations mandates system. 

He was recalled to England in 1917 to serve as Parliamentary Private Secretary to Lord Milner and as assistant secretary in the War Cabinet headed by Prime Minister David Lloyd George, and to Sir Mark Sykes. Zionist leader Chaim Weizmann, a personal friend, took refuge in Ormsby-Gore's London home while the former was in the capital for the cabinet approval of the Balfour Declaration. With Weizmann's approval, Ormsby-Gore was the British military liaison officer with the Zionist mission in the Holy Land (then lately liberated from Ottoman Turkish rule) during March to August 1918. After the armistice, he was part of the British delegation to the peace conference at Paris in 1919.

Ormsby-Gore remained serving in the yeomanry after the war until 1921. In 1939 he was appointed an honorary colonel of the 10th Battalion of the Royal Welch Fusiliers.

Political career
Harlech was elected as Member of Parliament (MP) for Denbigh Boroughs by a majority of eight votes at the January 1910 general election, sitting for the seat until he was selected for and won Stafford at the 1918 general election. He sat in the House of Commons until he entered the House of Lords on succeeding to his father's peerage in 1938 as the 4th Baron Harlech.

He was British representative to the Permanent Mandates Commission of the League of Nations from 1921 to 1922. He played a catalyst role in expanding the powers of the Commission and making colonial powers accountable to the Commission. He was influential in establishing a process whereby subjects in the mandates could petition the League of Nations and have their grievances publicized.

He served as Under-Secretary of State for the Colonies from 1922 to 1929 (with a brief interruption during the short-lived Labour government of 1924). 

In the 1927 New Year Honours, he was sworn of the Privy Council. Harlech also held office in the National Government as Postmaster-General in 1931, as First Commissioner of Works from 1931 to 1936 and as Colonial Secretary between 1936 and 1938, resigning, eight days after he entered the House of Lords, as protest of support of partitioning Palestine after pressure of Arab protests over Jewish immigration. After his resignation, he was appointed as Knight Grand Cross of the Order of St Michael and St George (GCMG) in the 1938 Birthday Honours. He was also a firm protester against Nazi Germany at that time.

During the Second World War, he was Civil Defence Commissioner for the North-East of England and then High Commissioner to South Africa from 1941 to 1944.

Cultural interests
He had an extensive library at his Shropshire home, Brogyntyn near Oswestry, which he downsized after moving out of the mansion in 1955. He and his father deposited a valuable collection of Brogyntyn manuscripts at the National Library of Wales.

He was author of:
Florentine Sculptors of the Fifteenth Century (1930)
Guide to the Mantegna Cartoons at Hampton Court (1935)
Three volumes in the series Guides to the Ancient Monuments of England.

Further work
After retiring from politics he served on the board of Midland Bank, owner of a banking house founded by his family, and was chairman of the Bank of West Africa. He also held the honorary post of Lord Lieutenant of Merionethshire between 1938 and 1957. On 12 March 1948 he was appointed as Knight Companion of the Order of the Garter (KG).

Described as having "a deep interest in the arts", Lord Harlech was trustee of the National Gallery (with brief interval) from 1927, and of the Tate Gallery from 1945 to 1953, chairman of the advisory committee to the Victoria and Albert Museum and of the Standing Commission on Museums and Galleries from 1948 to 1956.
He was the President of the national Library of Wales, 1950-58. He was Pro-Chancellor of the University of Wales and Constable of Harlech and Caernarfon castles.

Personal life
Lord Harlech married Lady Beatrice Edith Mildred Gascoyne-Cecil (born 10 August 1891, died 1980), daughter of James Gascoyne-Cecil, 4th Marquess of Salisbury, in 1913. They had six children:
 Mary Hermione Ormsby-Gore (born 7 September 1914, died 26 September 2006), married firstly Captain Robin Francis Campbell in 1936 (divorced 1946) and secondly in 1947 Sir Alexander Lees Mayall, KCVO, CMG.
 Owen Gerard Cecil Ormsby-Gore (born 30 July 1916, died 3 October 1935)
 William David Ormsby-Gore, 5th Baron Harlech (born 20 May 1918, died 26 January 1985)
 Katherine Margaret Alice Ormsby-Gore, DBE (born 4 January 1921, died 22 January 2017), married Maurice Macmillan, Viscount Macmillan of Ovenden, son of Harold Macmillan, 1st Earl of Stockton and Lady Dorothy Cavendish.
 Captain John Julian Stafford Ormsby-Gore (born 12 April 1925, died 18 April 2008), unmarried.
 Elizabeth Jane Ormsby-Gore (born 14 November 1929, died 19 January 2004), married William Simon Pease, 3rd Baron Wardington.

Lord Harlech died in February 1964, aged 78, and was succeeded in the barony by his second, but eldest surviving son David, who followed him into politics and served as British Ambassador to the United States in the 1960s. Beatrice, Lady Harlech, a 
Lady of the Bedchamber to Queen Elizabeth, died in 1980.

Coat of arms

Notes

References
Kidd, Charles, Williamson, David (editors). Debrett's Peerage and Baronetage (1990 edition). New York: St Martin's Press, 1990,

External links 
 
 

1885 births
1964 deaths
People educated at Eton College
Alumni of New College, Oxford
Ambassadors and High Commissioners of the United Kingdom to South Africa
British Secretaries of State
Conservative Party (UK) hereditary peers
Ormsby-Gore, William
Diplomatic peers
Knights of the Garter
Knights Grand Cross of the Order of St Michael and St George
Lord-Lieutenants of Merionethshire
Ormsby-Gore, William
Secretaries of State for the Colonies
Shropshire Yeomanry officers
United Kingdom Postmasters General
Ormsby-Gore, William
Ormsby-Gore, William
Ormsby-Gore, William
Ormsby-Gore, William
Ormsby-Gore, William
Ormsby-Gore, William
Ormsby-Gore, William
Ormsby-Gore, William
Ormsby-Gore, William
Harlech, B4
William
Members of the Privy Council of the United Kingdom
Arab Bureau officers
4
Eldest sons of British hereditary barons
Members of the Parliament of the United Kingdom for Stafford
Ministers in the Chamberlain peacetime government, 1937–1939
Welsh landowners
Place of birth missing
Welsh art historians
People associated with the Tate galleries
People associated with the National Gallery, London